Jonas Hurst is a British singer, television presenter, trainer and theatrical producer. He performed on Minipops and in the 1986 movie Absolute Beginners (credited as "Jonas"). He is the son of producer Mike Hurst. Together with television presenter Sally Gray he runs a company called Presenters Inc, specializing in television presenter training and is a theatrical producer running The Hurst Children's Theatre Group in Harpenden. Together with Adrian Plunkett he forms a band called Jonas and Plunkett. He has six siblings and is a father of three.

References

Living people
People from Harpenden
British male singers
British television presenters
Year of birth missing (living people)